Merry Christmas with Love is the first Christmas album and second studio album by American recording artist Clay Aiken. It was released on November 16, 2004, through RCA Records. The production on the album was produced by Phil Ramone and Walter Afanasieff.

The album debuted at number four on the US Billboard 200 chart, selling 270,000 copies in its first week. It was also recognized by Billboard as the best-selling Christmas/holiday album of 2004 and the best-selling Christian album of 2005. The album certified platinum by the Recording Industry Association of America (RIAA) in January 2005.

Aiken has toured four times with his Joyful Noise Tour (2004-2007) to promote this album. The album was re-released on August 18, 2009, on the Sony label.

Awards and nominations

Tours
2004: The Joyful Noise Tour
 28-city two-hour holiday concert (November - December 2004)
 Featured 30 piece orchestras as well as both adult and children's choirs invited from each host city.
 The Joyful Noise Tour's official sponsor was Ronald McDonald House Charities.

2005: The Joyful Noise 2005 Tour
 36-city, 40-concert U.S. and Canada tour (November - December 2005)
 The concert featured a traveling cast of actors, singers, and dancers, as well as a supporting cast recruited from each host city, to provide the theatrical component that threaded together the musical performances.
 The opening act and contributing musician was pop-classical pianist William Joseph.

2006: Holiday Tour
 18-city tour of cities mostly in the eastern U.S. (December 2006)
 Performed with local orchestras, which also opened the concerts with a program of seasonal music.

2007: Christmas in the Heartland
 21-date eastern U. S. tour began on November 26 in Wichita, Kansas, and ended on December 22, 2007, in Merrillville, Indiana.
 Local orchestras performed the music.
 Holiday stories submitted and read by fans were spaced throughout the performance as lead in to four of the song selections.

Aiken has ended each of his Christmas tours with his signature Christmas song, "Don't Save It All for Christmas Day".

Commercial performance
Merry Christmas with Love debuted at number four on the US Billboard 200 chart, selling 270,000 copies in its first week. This became Aiken's second US top-ten debut. By the end of 2004, the album sold 1,004,000 copies. The album set a new record for fastest-selling holiday album in the SoundScan era (since March 1991) and tied Céline Dion's record for the highest debut by a holiday album in the history of Billboard magazine. On January 6, 2005, the album was certified platinum by the Recording Industry Association of America (RIAA) for sales of over a million copies. As of February 2011, the album has sold 1.4 million copies in the United States.

Track listing

Personnel

Musicians 
 Allan Schwartzberg - drums
 Vinnie Colaiuta - drums
 David Finck - bass
 Nathan East - bass
 Ira Siegel - acoustic guitar
 Jeff Mironov - guitar
 Mike Landau - electric guitar
 Kenny Ascher - piano
 Steve Ferrera - harp, percussion
 Walter Afanasieff - keyboard
 Conesha Mone't - background vocals
 Quiana Parler - background vocals
 Jacob Juttrell - background vocals
 Angela Fisher - background vocals
 Michael McElroy - background vocals
 Clarke Anderson - background vocals
 Darryl Phinnesse - background vocals
 The McCrary Choir - background vocals
 Broadway Inspirational Voices - background vocals
 Kate Coffman - soprano
 Laura Dean - soprano
 Tanesha Gary - soprano
 Catrice Joseph-Hart - soprano
 Gerti Lee James - soprano
 Bertilla Baker - alto
 Tracy Nicole Chapman - alto
 La-Rita Gaskins - alto
 Lucia Giannetta - alto
 Danielle Lee Greaves - alto
 Maurice Lauchner - tenor
 John Eric Parker - tenor
 Glenn Rainey - tenor
 Eliseo Roman - tenor
 Christopher Zelno - tenor

Production 
 Andy Zulla - mixing
 Joel Moss - recording
 Mark Valentine - additional recording
 Emanuel Kiriakou - engineer
 Joe Wohlmuth - additional engineering
 David Channing - additional engineering
 Jay Spears - assistant engineer
 Mike Schroffel - assistant engineer
 Glenn Pittman - assistant engineer
 Alex Rodriguez - assistant engineer
 Dave Reitzas - lead vocal engineer
 Jorge Calandrelli - arrangement
 Patrick Williams - arrangement
 Rich Davis - production coordination
 Elena Barere - concert master
 Torrie Zito - conductor
 William Ross - conductor, arranger
 Humberto Gatica - orchestra engineer
 Sandy Decrescent - orchestra contractor
 David Lowe - orchestra contractor
 Jill Dell'Abate production manager
 Joe Yannece - mastering

Charts

Weekly charts

Year-end charts

Singles

Certifications

See also
 List of Billboard Top Holiday Albums number ones of the 2000s

References

Clay Aiken albums
Albums produced by Phil Ramone
Albums produced by Walter Afanasieff
2004 Christmas albums
Christmas albums by American artists
Pop Christmas albums
RCA Records Christmas albums
19 Recordings albums